Tein Oo Lay Pyay Maung Ko Say is a 1977 Burmese black-and-white drama film, directed by Win Oo starring Win Oo, Khin Yu May and Tin Tin Nwet.

Cast
Win Oo as Kyaw Min Win
Khin Yu May as May Hnin
Tin Tin Nwet as Mu Yar
Kyaw Swar Win as Kyaw Swar Win
Thida Win as Thida Win
Jolly Swe as Thaw Tar Sein

References

1977 films
1970s Burmese-language films
Burmese drama films
Films shot in Myanmar
1977 drama films